WVLT may refer to:

 WVLT (FM), a radio station (92.1 FM) licensed to Vineland, New Jersey, United States
 WVLT-TV, a CBS-affiliated television station (channel 34, virtual 8) licensed to Knoxville, Tennessee, United States